Andrey Tokarev is a Russian cross country skier, biathlete, sighted guide and Paralympic Champion.

He was awarded the Order of Honour by Russian President Dmitry Medvedev in 2010.

One of his most notable achievements is winning the most medals at the Vancouver 2010 Winter Paralympics, with six medals, including one gold, as the sighted guide for Nikolay Polukhin at the 2010 Paralympic Winter Games in Vancouver.

References

Medalists at the 2010 Winter Paralympics
Russian male cross-country skiers
Russian male biathletes
Paralympic biathletes of Russia
Paralympic sighted guides
Paralympic cross-country skiers of Russia
Biathletes at the 2010 Winter Paralympics
Cross-country skiers at the 2010 Winter Paralympics
Paralympic gold medalists for Russia
Paralympic silver medalists for Russia
Paralympic bronze medalists for Russia
Living people
Year of birth missing (living people)
Paralympic medalists in cross-country skiing
Paralympic medalists in biathlon